Petroleum Helicopters International, Inc. (PHI), is an American commercial helicopter operator, founded in 1949, by Robert L. Suggs. The company is based in Lafayette, Louisiana and provides service for the oil and gas industry, aeromedical services, pilot training and aircraft maintenance.

In October 2017, PHI acquired Helicopters (NZ) from HNZ Group.

On March 15, 2019, the company filed for Chapter 11 bankruptcy.

On June 5, 2019, court-supervised arbitration announced an agreement to force the retirement of CEO Al Gonsoulin and strip him of his shares.

History
PHI Inc. was founded by Robert L. Suggs and Maurice M. Bayon with a startup cost of $100,000, and three Bell 47 helicopters. They started by providing service to a seismographic group working in the wetlands of Louisiana. The company's service extended to offshore drilling platforms in the Gulf of Mexico, and grew their fleet with the addition of the Sikorsky S-55. and the Sikorsky S-58 helicopters. Over the next couple of decades the company expanded their fleet to 300 helicopters, which was the biggest non-military group of aircraft., and constructed the world's largest heliport at Lake Palourde in Morgan City In 1981 Petroleum Helicopters created PHI Air Medical, and became a provider of aeromedical services.

Fleet
PHI Inc. owns or operates 259 aircraft domestically and internationally. 162 aircraft are dedicated to its Oil and Gas segment. 88 aircraft are dedicated to its Air Medical segment. They also operate five aircraft for the National Science Foundation in Antarctica.

References

External links
 

Helicopter airlines
Airlines based in Louisiana
Airlines established in 1949
1949 establishments in Louisiana
Companies based in Lafayette, Louisiana
Companies that filed for Chapter 11 bankruptcy in 2019